Lakorn is a popular genre of fiction in Thai television. They are shown generally at prime-time on Thai television channels, starting usually on, before or approximately at 20:25-20:30 hrs local time. An episode of a prime-time drama is between 45 minutes to two hours long including commercials. Each series is a finished story, unlike Western "cliffhanger" dramas, but rather like Hispanic telenovelas.

The first television drama in Thailand is Suriyani Mai Yom Taengngan (สุริยานีไม่ยอมแต่งงาน, lit. "Suriyani refused to marry") starring Mom Rajawongse Thanadsri Svasti and Chotirot Samosorn with Nuanla-or Thongnuedee from the composition of Nai Ramkarn (Prayad Sor Nakanat) broadcast on January 5, 1956 on Channel 4 Bangkhunphrom (now Channel 9), the first Thai television station. It can be considered the broadcast was only two months after the establishment of the station.

A series will run for about three months. It may air two or three episodes a week, the pattern being Monday–Tuesday, Wednesday–Thursday Monday-Thursday (weekday slots) or Friday–Sunday (weekend slot). A channel will air three soap operas simultaneously at any given time (each producing their own series by separate production houses). Channels will compete for the most popular stars as they attract the most viewers. Some examples are Channel 3, 5 and 7 as well to a lesser extent on Channel 9.

While the "best" series are shown at night right after the news, the ones with a smaller profiles (and shorter run time) will be shown in the evenings from 17:00–18:00. In some cases, the most popular prime-time series are shown on re-runs a couple of years after their initial release, generally in the afternoon.

A lakorn episode is normally 1 hour and a small amount or 30 minutes. When internationally broadcast, the running time is around 45 min. per episode.

Since January 20, 2023, every Friday night after the evening news (second edition), Channel 7 has stopped broadcasting the television series as it used to be until it became familiar. But the station has turned to broadcast live combat sports matches of the ONE Championship instead, which is one of the great revolutions in the Thai television industry.

Genre 
Romance, Comedy, Thriller, Action, Psychological, etc. Apart from Lakorn, Boys Love or BL series are booming across the globe.

Folk stories 
Thai television soap operas have contributed to popularize the spirits and legends of the folklore of Thailand. Some soap operas, such as "Raeng Ngao", include the popular ghosts in Thai culture interacting with the living, while others are based on traditional Thai legends and folk tales such as "Nang Sib Song", "Kaki" and "Thep Sarm Rudoo".

Law 

Thailand has strict censorship laws on films containing nudity, sexual intercourse, smoking opium, or which might offend religious sensibilities. There are no classifications to rate films for different ages so censors often obscure scenes by scratching the celluloid or smudging it with a translucent gel. When actors are playing cards in TV series, a sentence displays that playing cards with money is forbidden by the law.

On Thai television, Chinese, Japanese, American, and Indian films are broadcast.

Some series are subject to a rating. Most of BBTV Channel 7 programs are usually rated as PG-18 (children under 18 should seek parental guidance).

International broadcasts 
Prior to the 2000's, Thai TV soap operas were primarily popular in neighbouring countries such as Myanmar, Cambodia and Laos. Several Cambodian television channels aired Thai soap operas instead of their local ones. Dao Pra Sook was the most popular series for Khmer viewers. Occasionally, due to historical conflicts between the neighbouring countries, the content of these television programs would lead to offline political conflicts. For example, a plot line concerning Angkor Wat led to riots at the Thai embassy in Cambodia and Thai lakorn were banned in early–2003. However, in 2015, Thai content rapidly returned to popularity amongst Cambodian viewers and while they're mainly viewed on online platforms, many television stations were also broadcasting Thai dramas.

Apart from their immediate neighbours, Thai dramas have become increasingly popular in other Southeast Asian countries. Over the years, several Thai TV soap operas have begun to become popular in Singapore as Nang Tard and Love Destiny aired successfully in that country. They are usually broadcast in Singapore one or two weeks after airing in Thailand, primarily on Mediacorp's Channel U. In 2020, Mediacorp announced that they will be airing a comprehensive set of Thai television content to their streaming platforms with English & Mandarin subtitling option. Several Thai hit series have also been broadcast on major national public or commercial television channels in Malaysia (TV3), Indonesia (Rajawali TV), and Vietnam (VTV1). Likewise, Thai content have also gained considerable following in the Philippines, with numerous Thai series such as 2Gether the Series and The Gifted regularly topping Twitter trends in the country. In 2018, GMA announced that they will be broadcasting more Thai series and exploring collaboration options for production and talent development. ABS-CBN have also announced that they will be airing multiple Thai series on the Kapamilya channel and their streaming platform, as well as further partnership with GMMTV. Filipino newspaper Daily Tribune stated that "Thai lakorn (“television play”),...is slowly inching its way to the top of the tier."

Outside Southeast Asia, Thai television content have also gained popularity in the broader Asian region, particularly China and Japan. In the 2000's, many Thai soap operas are aired in China, dubbed into Chinese language. With the advent of online and digital media, Thai television content continued to gain popularity in China through word of mouth and viral hits on social networking sites such as Bilibili & Weibo. By the late 2010's, Thai content became a mainstay in Chinese streaming platforms, with led to many Chinese companies forming partnerships and collaborating with Thai production companies, such as iQIYI forming a partnership with RS Television to remake Thai content for Chinese audiences. Over the years, numerous Thai series were adapted and remade for Chinese audiences through such collaborations, such as Project S: The Series & My Husband in Law. In 2011, Thai dramas quickly became popular in China, with a high performance-price-ratio, passing South Korean dramas as the second most popular country of origin for foreign shows in China, following Hong Kong dramas. The rise of Thai entertainment in China have had an effect in other aspects of Thai-China relations, with Thai dramas credited as being partially responsible for the popularity of Thailand as a tourism destination amongst Chinese travellers and being consistently awarded as 'Weibo's most popular destination' award.

Meanwhile in Japan, Thai dramas experienced a boom in 2020, with Yahoo Japan stating that "the Thai wave is coming after the Korean wave." While the initial boom was led by Thai BL dramas such as 2Gether and SOTUS, the introduction of Thai entertainment to the Japanese market let Japanese consumers to explore other Thai entertainment content as well. After months of sustained popularity, TV Asahi announced a business partnership with GMMTV to "deliver fresh and stellar Thai content to the Japanese market and further unlock the great potential 'Thai style' entertainment holds".

With its rising popularity, numerous streaming platforms such as Netflix, Line TV and WeTV have purchased Thai content to stream to global audiences. Aside from airing the content, many of the streaming platforms have also formed partnership with Thai production houses to develop their own original content for their platforms.

Thai soap operas are available in Nepal alongside English language, Hindi, Korean and Chinese dramas.

Thai soap operas are available to stream with subtitles on Iflix in Sri Lanka.

Recently, a historical romantic drama set in the Ayutthaya Kingdom Love Destiny (2018) became hit across countries including Russia.

In 2021, Thai primetime Lakorns have started to broadcast via Netflix worldwide in the same as in Thailand.

Records 
Khu Kam was based on novel of the same name by Thommayanti, starring pop star Thongchai McIntyre and Kamolchanok Komoltithi, broadcast on Channel 7 in early 1990. It created the phenomenon by being the highest rated drama in the Thai television industry with ratings up to 40 to this day. In addition to this, the main theme song of the drama Peerapong Polchana and Kamolchanok Komoltithi became a major hit and remains popular to this day.
Dao Pra Sook became the most popular series in the 1990s and one of the first of leading the Thai soap opera reputation into aboard screen within the highest rate drama at 1994 including several foreign release. The highest rated country after Thailand, is Cambodia with giving the nickname for Suvanant Kongying as the morning star as well as the title of the series.
Susan Khon Pen is a series which mostly remake as at least three times just in only one channel.
Sisa Marn is noted the scariest series along with Pob Pee Fa and Tayat Asoon.
In 2008, Kom Faek set the record for the highest rated Thai soap opera in history as well as for Channel 7, with almost 15 million viewers.
Kaew Tah Pee has proved to be one of the most beloved series amongst international fans.

List of classic/folk-style series 
Kwan Fa Nah Dum (1983)
Thep Sung Warn (1985)
Thep Sarm Rudoo (1987)
Ban Deang Nang Ay (1987)
Jaoying Khuntong (1987)
Kaew Na Mah (1987)
Pi Khun Tong (1987–1988)
Nang Sib Song (1988)
Prasuton-Manora (1988)
Tida Dao Dum (1988)
Uthaitaywee (1989)
Gomin (1989)
Sung Singh Chai (1990)
Malaithon (1991–1992)
Janthakorop (1993)
Bua Kaew Bua Tong (1993–1994)
Bla Boo Tong (1994)
Gro Pid Jid See (1995)
Kraitong (1995)
Mane Nope Gaow (1996)
Nam Jai Mae (1997)
Pra Rodthasen (1998)
Laksanawong (1999)
Nang Paya Prai (1999)
Nang Sib Song (2000)
Si Yod Kumon (2001)
Kaew Na Mah (2001)
Prasuton Manorah (2002)
Uttai Tawee (2003)
Thep Sarm Rudoo (2003)
Singha Krai Phob (2004)
Gomin (2006)
Bua Kaew Juk Krod (2006)
Pra Tinawong (2007)
Sung Tung (2008)
Bla Boo Tong  (2009)
Tuk Ka Tah Tong (2010)
Darb 7 See Manee 7 Sang (2011)

See also 
 Television in Thailand
 List of Thai television soap operas

References

External links 
Thai TV Drama at eThaiCD
Sarn World
Thai TV on Thai World View
Iheart Lakorn
EnTinaMent
Darkness Lakorns (lakorn translations)

Soap Opera
Television genres
Asian drama